Smith Lake may refer to:

Antarctica 
Smith Lake (Antarctica)

Australia 
 Smith Lake, a lake and village in the Mid North Coast, New South Wales, Australia 
 Smiths Lake, New South Wales, often mistakenly called Smith Lake

United States
 Lewis Smith Lake, a lake in North-Central Alabama
 Smith Lake (University of Alaska Fairbanks), a lake in Fairbanks North Star Borough, Alaska
 Smith Lake in Cross County, Arkansas
 Smith Lake in Desha County, Arkansas
 Smith Lake in Hempstead County, Arkansas
 Smith Lake in Miller County, Arkansas
 Smith Lake in White County, Arkansas
 Smith Lake in Boundary County, Idaho
 Smith Lake (Berrien County, Michigan)
 Smith Lake, a lake in Carver County, Minnesota
 Smith Lake (Murray County, Minnesota)
 Smith Lake (Wright County, Minnesota)
 Smith and Bybee Wetlands Natural Area, comprising Smith and Bybee lakes, part of the Columbia Slough system in North Portland
 Smith Lake, a reservoir in Stafford County, Virginia
 Smith Lake (Thurston County, Washington)